George Dewey Metivier (May 6, 1898 – March 2, 1947) was a Major League Baseball pitcher who played for three seasons. He played for the Cleveland Indians from 1922 to 1924, playing in 54 career games.

External links

1898 births
1947 deaths
Major League Baseball pitchers
Cleveland Indians players
Baseball players from Massachusetts